Tripoli International Airport  is a closed international airport built to serve Tripoli, the capital city of Libya. The airport is located in the area of Qasr bin Ghashir,  from central Tripoli. It used to be the hub for Libyan Airlines, Afriqiyah Airways, and Buraq Air.

The airport has been closed intermittently since 2011 and as of early 2018, flights to and from Tripoli have been using Mitiga International Airport instead.

During the 2014 Libyan Civil War, the airport was heavily damaged in the Battle of Tripoli Airport. The airport reopened for limited commercial use in July 2017. In April 2019, however, it was reported that Mitiga had become the last functioning airport in Tripoli during the 2019–20 Western Libya campaign. It was soon acknowledged that the ruling Government of National Accord (GNA) had bombed the airport in order to recapture it from the Libyan National Army (LNA). Mitiga was soon shut down as well after being bombed by the LNA, thus making Misrata Airport, located approximately 200 km (125 miles) to the east down the coast, the nearest airport for Tripoli residents.

History
The airport was originally called Tripoli-Castel Benito Airport and was a Regia Aeronautica (Italian Air Force) airfield built in 1934 in the southern outskirts of Italian Tripoli.

In 1938 the governor of Italian Libya, Italo Balbo, enlarged the military airfield to create an international airport for civilians served by Ala Littoria, the official Italian airline: the Aeroporto di Tripoli-Castel Benito. The first international flights were to Rome, Tunis, and Malta. In 1939, a flight from Rome to Ethiopia and Somalia was one of the first intercontinental flights.

During World War II the airport was destroyed, but the airfield was later used by the British Royal Air Force and named RAF Castel Benito, changing to RAF Idris in 1952. In the 1950s and 1960s the airport was known as Tripoli Idris International Airport. It was renovated for national and international air travel in September 1978. The existing international terminal was designed and built from a masterplan developed by Sir Alexander Gibb & Partners.

The airport closed from March 2011 to October 2011 as a result of the United Nations Security Council establishing a no-fly zone over Libya. The Zintan Brigade captured the airport during their advance on Tripoli on 21 August 2011. The airport was officially reopened on 11 October 2011.

On 14 July 2014, the airport was the site of fierce battle as militias from the city of Misrata attempted to take control of the airport. The airport has been closed to flights since the clashes. On 23 August 2014, after 40 days of clashes, Zintan forces, which controlled the airport, withdrew. The Los Angeles Times reported that at least 90% of the airport's facilities and 20 airplanes were destroyed in the fighting.

While still under the control of Misrata militias, the VIP terminal, which had not been not as badly damaged, was reopened on 16 February 2017. A new passenger terminal is in planning by the political body representing the militias.

In April 2019, the airport was captured by forces loyal to the Libyan National Army (LNA) and its leader Khalifa Haftar and was held for over a year, despite the control of the airport passing back to the GNA briefly in May 2019. Due to its location at the southern border of the Tripoli Metropolitan Area, it served as a part of the larger suburban stronghold of Qasr bin Ghashir village south of Tripoli City, used as a staging ground in attacks attempting to capture or weaken GNA's hold of the capital. As a result of ongoing clashes, it was acknowledged that the open terrain was subject to retaliatory and preliminary bombing by the GNA from Tripoli frontier, making it unusable as an airport.

The airport, along with the village of Qasr bin Ghashir, was retaken in June 2020 by the GNA as part of its 2020 offensive to push back the LNA and end the siege of the capital city. The taking of the airport signified that the GNA had regained control of the entire city and metropolitan area of Tripoli.

Facilities

Terminals
The airport had one main passenger terminal that served international and domestic departures and arrivals. Check-in facilities were all located on the ground floor. The departure gates were located on the floor above as was the duty-free section. Beside this was a prayer room and a first-class lounge which served business class and above on almost all airlines operating from the airport. Seen on google maps, the entire passenger terminal is completely demolished, however the jet ways can still be seen sitting in the position relative to their formal gates.

The airport operated 24 hours a day. There was no overnight accommodation at the airport but there were plans to build an airport hotel to serve transit flyers. A restaurant was on the fourth floor of the international terminal. The head office of the Libyan Civil Aviation Authority was on the airport property.

Expansion plans

In September 2007, the Libyan government announced a project to upgrade and expand the airport. The eventual total cost of the project, contracted to a joint venture between Brazil's Odebrecht, TAV Construction of Turkey, Consolidated Contractors Company of Greece and Vinci Construction of France, was LD2.54 billion ($2.1 billion). The project was to construct two new terminals at the airport (an East Terminal and a West Terminal) on either side of the existing International Terminal. Each of the new terminals would have been  in size, and collectively they would have had a capacity of 20 million passengers and a parking lot for 4,400 vehicles. French company Aéroports de Paris designed the terminals, which were expected to serve 100 aircraft simultaneously. Work started in October 2007 on the first new terminal. The initial capacity will be 6 million passengers when the first module comes into operation.

Preparation was also underway for the second new terminal, which would eventually have brought the total capacity to 20 million passengers; the completed airport is expected to strengthen Libya's position as an African aviation hub. Although the government identified Tripoli airport as a "fast track" project in 2007, leading to construction work starting before the design was fully developed, the project was not be finished until at least May 2011. The cost of the project had also been rising, leading to an intense round of renegotiations. The project has since been halted due to the ongoing civil war that led to further damages to the airport.

In February 2019 the Libyan Ministry of Transportation announced that work at the airport had been resumed. In May 2021 the foreign minister of Italy, Luigi Di Maio, announced that Italian companies would begin construction work at the airport in a few months.

Airlines and destinations
As of July 2014, all passenger flights into Tripoli use Mitiga International Airport; all scheduled cargo operations into Tripoli International Airport have also ceased.

See also
Transport in Libya
List of airports in Libya
List of the busiest airports in Africa

References

External links

Year of establishment missing
Tripoli, Libya
Airports in Libya
Buildings and structures in Tripoli, Libya